Rear Admiral Mohammad Moyeenul Haque is a two-star admiral in Bangladesh Navy who is incumbent Assistant Chief of Naval Staff (Material) ACNS(M). Prior to join at the current position he was Senior Directing Staff - SDS (Navy) at National Defence College. He took over the command of Commodore Superintendent Dockyard on 23 February 2017. Previously he was the General Manager (Production) at Khulna Shipyard.

Early life and education
Mohammad Moyeenul Haque completed his higher secondary certificate from Faujdarhat Cadet College. Later he joined Bangladesh Navy as officer cadet in 1984. After two years of military training he got commissioned on 01 Jul 1986. Mohammad Moyeenul Haque did his engineering degree from BUET at Naval Architecture & Marine Engineering. He did different naval professional training at home and abroad in his service career. Following this he completed his post graduations from National University, DSCSC (Mirpur). Besides he did several courses from Pakistan Navy Engineering College PNS JAUHAR, National Defence University, Pakistan and various other institutions.

Military career
Mohammad Moyeenul Haque served as Engineer Officer at different Navy ships and establishment. He had served in both staff and instructional capacities in different ships, establishments and formation headquarters. He also served as Director at Directorate of Naval Engineering in naval headquarters of Bangladesh Navy. He served two tenures with the UN as a member of military contingent in Kuwait and another was in Liberia as a military observer during 2004–2005. Besides his military career he also appointed in Home Ministry at Rapid Action Battalion.

Award
He got NPP award for his tremendous service in Bangladesh Navy in 2013.

References

External links
Official biography at Bangladesh Navy

Living people
Bangladesh Navy personnel
Year of birth missing (living people)
Faujdarhat Cadet College alumni
Bangladesh University of Engineering and Technology alumni